North Dakota Highway 6 (ND 6) is a  major north–south highway in North Dakota. It runs from South Dakota Highway 63 in McLaughlin to Interstate 94 Business Loop in downtown Mandan.

Route description
ND 6 begins at the South Dakota state line, where the roadway continues as South Dakota Highway 63. It has two intersections with ND 24. In between the two intersections with that highway travels through Selfridge. North of there, it travels by Breien, and later encounters the eastern terminus of ND 21 turning right at that intersection before making a sharp left curve and heading north again. At the intersection with Morton County Road 136 it travels by Saint Anthony, then travels along the west side of the Morton County State Game Management Area. A sign that the highway is approaching its northern terminus is when it passes the Mandan Municipal Airport. The highway doesn't officially enter Mandan, until roughly around 19th Street, and from there it passes by a United States Department of Agriculture (USDA) lab, and a local youth corrections center. It then crosses a bridge over the Heart River, where on the other side it becomes 10th Avenue and cuts through the Mandan Municipal Golf Course. Immediately after a bridge over the BNSF Railway (BNSF) Mandan Rail Yard, ND 6 ends at Interstate 94 Business Loop (BL 94), although 10th Avenue continues northbound as a local residential city street.

Major intersections

References

006
Transportation in Sioux County, North Dakota
Transportation in Morton County, North Dakota